Dennis Harris may refer to:

 Dennis Harris (alternative medicine) (born 1938), medical doctor known for selling alternative medicine remedies
 Dennis Harris (cricketer) (1911–1959), English cricketer
 Dennis Harris (rugby league), rugby league footballer of the 1960s and 1970s for Castleford
 Dennis Harris (musician), Philadelphia session musician and arranger